Boris Nikolayevich Romanov (27 February 1937 – 10 February 2014) was a Soviet cyclist. He competed in the sprint event at the 1956 Summer Olympics.

References

1937 births
2014 deaths
Sportspeople from Tula, Russia
Soviet male cyclists
Olympic cyclists of the Soviet Union
Cyclists at the 1956 Summer Olympics
Place of birth missing